Anelaphus cinnabarinus is a species of beetle in the family Cerambycidae. It was described by Fisher in 1942.

References

Anelaphus
Beetles described in 1942